William May (born January 17, 1979) is an American synchronized swimmer. Performing primarily in duets, May won several national and international events. Because of his sex, May was not allowed to compete in the 2004 Summer Olympics.

Early career
May was born in Syracuse, New York. He became interested in synchronized swimming when he was 10 years old while living in Syracuse, after watching his sister in a beginning class.  He explained why he became involved, "I did competitive swimming there and the synchro class was right after it, so we couldn't go home until she was done. It was either try it with her or sit outside the pool and watch her, so my mom told me to try it, just to be in the water and be doing something."

May began taking lessons and later performed with a local team, the Syracuse Synchro Cats.  After the Synchro Cats disbanded, he performed with the Oswego Lakettes.

In 1996, at age 16, May moved to Santa Clara, California.  He tried out for the Santa Clara Aquamaids, one of the top synchronized swimming programs in the United States, and was accepted into the junior A squad.  May eventually was promoted to the Aquamaid's top "A" squad.

Competition
Teaming with partner Kristina Lum, May won the duet event at the 1998 US national championships.  The pair then won the silver medal in the event at the 1998 Goodwill Games.  Because May is male, he was barred from competing in the 1999 Pan American Games.

The International Swimming Federation (FINA) allowed May to compete in its sanctioned events.  In 1999, May finished first in duet at the Swiss Open and French Open.  He won the Grand Slam at the 2000 Jantzen Nationals and was named the US Synchronized Swimming Athlete of the Year in 1998 and 1999.

May was not allowed to compete at the 2004 Summer Olympics because Synchronized swimming at the Summer Olympics consisted of two women's only events.

Later career

In 2008, May performed in Cirque du Soleil's water-based show, O.  He was paid $100 for each performance.

Comeback to the sport
With the mixed duet added to the World Championship program, Bill May returned to the sport after a 10-year retirement.  On July 26, 2015, he became the first man ever to win Synchronized swimming gold  at a major event, such as an Olympic or World Championships, by winning the mixed duet technical routine gold, with his partner Christina Jones at the World Aquatic Championships in Kazan, Russia.  Aleksandr Maltsev from Russia would become the second man by defeating May and his partner Kristina Lum with his partner Darina Valitova in the mixed duet free routine on July 30, 2015.  May and Lum would finish second and win the silver. Maltsev and Valitova had been a close second to May and Jones in the technical routine event. Lum had been May's duet partner in 1998, where they also made in winning the duet at the U.S Synchronized Swimming Championships, and a silver at the 1998 Goodwill Games.

References

External links
 
 

1979 births
Living people
American synchronized swimmers
Male synchronized swimmers
World Aquatics Championships medalists in synchronised swimming
Synchronized swimmers at the 2015 World Aquatics Championships
Synchronized swimmers at the 2017 World Aquatics Championships
2004 Summer Olympics
Sex segregation
Discrimination in the United States
Gender equality
Artistic swimmers at the 2019 World Aquatics Championships
Goodwill Games medalists in synchronized swimming
Competitors at the 1998 Goodwill Games